Qingxiu District is the county seat and one of 7 districts of the prefecture-level city of Nanning, the capital of Guangxi Zhuang Autonomous Region, South China. It is Xincheng District approved to rename to the present name by the Chinese State Council on September 15, 2004.

References

External links 
District Government Website 

County-level divisions of Guangxi
Nanning